Lufthansa Aviation Training GmbH is the flight academy subsidiary of Lufthansa, that trains Lufthansa Group pilots as well as cabin and technical staff. The company has about 500 employees and has been in business for around 50 years.

Operations

Lufthansa Aviation Training owns 9 subsidiaries: Lufthansa Aviation Training Crew Academy GmbH, Lufthansa Aviation Training Berlin GmbH, Lufthansa Aviation Training Operations Germany GmbH, Lufthansa Aviation Training Germany GmbH, Lufthansa Aviation Training Austria GmbH, Lufthansa Aviation Training USA Inc., Lufthansa Aviation Training Pilot Academy GmbH and Aviation Quality Services (AQS).

Locations
As of 2021, Lufthansa Aviation Training maintains two brands with the following locations:
 Lufthansa Aviation Training – Berlin, Essen, Frankfurt am Main, Cologne, Munich, Vienna and Zürich
 European Flight Academy – Bremen, Grenchen, Phoenix (Arizona), Rostock and Zürich

In February 2021, Lufthansa Aviation Training announced to relocate their entire German practical training from Bremen Airport to Rostock Airport.

Lufthansa Aviation Training USA
The Aviation Training Center Arizona is a facility in Goodyear, Arizona, where future Lufthansa pilots conduct flight training with small aircraft. It is operated by the Lufthansa subsidiary Lufthansa Aviation Training. The base contains a building where the students live in their own apartments.

Aviation Quality Services GmbH
Aviation Quality Services (AQS) is a subsidiary of Lufthansa Flight Training, located in Frankfurt, Germany. The company is an IATA accredited IOSA Audit Organization and an IATA accredited Endorsed Training Organization. AQS conducts audits, and auditor, quality, and Safety Management Systems training. In 2003, AQS was the first company to be accredited by IATA as an IOSA Audit Organization and Endorsed Training Organization. Two years later, the company became the world's leading IOSA Audit Organization.

Fleet

 Beechcraft Bonanza
 Cessna 525 Citation CJ1+
 Cirrus SR20
 Diamond DA42
 Diamond DA42
 Grob G 120
 Piper PA-42 Cheyenne
 Piper PA-44 Seminole
 Saab 91B Safir

See also
 École de l'Air
 Empire Central Flying School
 Integrated pilot training

References

External links

 Lufthansa Aviation Training website
 Aviation Quality Services website

Flight Training
Companies based in Bremen
Aerospace companies of Germany
Training companies of Europe
Aviation schools in Germany
Education in Bremen
Aviation schools in the United States
Vocational education in Arizona